The 50th International Film Festival Rotterdam, was the 2021 installment of the International Film Festival Rotterdam, which took place on 1–7 February 2021 and 2–6 June 2021. The first part of the edition focused on the main Tiger, Big Screen, Ammodo Tiger Short, and Limelight programmes. Whilst, the second part focused on the Harbour, Bright Future, Cinema Regained, Classics and Short and Mid-Length Film sections.

The event was presented as a hybrid event, with a film programme was available online in the Netherlands whilst physically screened in cinemas across the country.

Indian drama film, Pebbles by Vinothraj P.S., won Tiger Award, the top prize.

Juries

Tiger
Lemohang Jeremiah Mosese, Mosotho screenwriter, film director and visual artist
Orwa Nyrabia, Syrian documentary film festival director
Hala Elkoussy, Egyptian artist and film director
Helena van der Meulen, Dutch screenwriter and film critic
Ilse Hughan, Dutch film producer

Ammodo Tiger Short
Anna Abrahams, audiovisual curator
Amira Gad, Egyptian-French curator and writer
Vincent Meessen, filmmaker

Official selections

Tiger
The following films were selected to compete for the Tiger Award. The line-up was announced on 22 December 2020.

Big Screen
The following films were selected to compete for the VPRO Big Screen Award. The line-up was announced on 22 December 2020.

Ammodo Tiger Short
The following films were selected to compete for the Ammodo Tiger Short Competition. The line-up was announced on 22 December 2020.

Art Directions
The programme highlighted the expansion of cinema to installations, exhibitions and live performance.

Bright Future
The programme highlighted first-feature films from promising filmmakers.

Cinema Regained
The programme offered restored classic films, documentaries on film culture and explorations of cinema's heritage.

Harbour
The programme showcased contemporary cinema.

Limelight
The programme showcased cinematic highlights of film festival favourites and international award-winners.

Short & Mid-length
The programmes highlighted mid-length films and short films.

Awards

Awards and competition
Tiger Award: Pebbles by Vinothraj P.S.
Special Jury Award:
A Corsican Summer by Pascal Tagnati
Looking for Venera by Norika Sefa
Ammodo Tiger Short Award:
Maat Means Land by Fox Maxy
Sunsets, everyday by Basir Mahmood
Terranova by Alejandro Pérez Serrano, Alejandro Alonso Estrella
Robby Müller Award: Kelly Reichardt
Big Screen Competition Award: The Dog Who Wouldn't Be Quiet by Ana Katz
IFFR Youth Jury Award: Night of the Kings by Philippe Lacôte

Audience Awards
BankGiro Loterij Audience Award:
Quo Vadis, Aida? by Jasmila Žbanić (February)
My Name Is Francesco Totti by Alex Infascelli (June)

Critics Awards
FIPRESCI Award: The Edge of Daybreak by Taiki Sakpisit
KNF Award: Manifesto by Ane Hjort Guttu

References

External links
 

International Film Festival Rotterdam
Events in Rotterdam
International Film Festival Rotterdam